Tessie is a feminine given name or nickname, often of Teresa or Theresa, which may refer to:

 Tessie Agana (born 1942), Filipina former child actress
 Tessie Aquino-Oreta (born 1944), Filipino politician
 Tessie Camilleri (1901–1930), first female graduate at the University of Malta
 Tessie Lambourne (born 1971), Kiribati civil servant, diplomat and politician
 Tessie Mobley (1906–1990), American operatic soprano
 Tessie Oelrichs (1871–1926), American socialite
 Tessie O'Shea (1913–1995), Welsh entertainer and actress
 Tessie Reynolds (1876–1954), British cyclist
 Tessie Santiago (born 1975), American actress
 Tessie Savelkouls (born 1992), Dutch retired judoka
 Tessie Soi (born c. 1960), Papua New Guinean social worker
 Tessie Thompson, fictional character in the British soap opera Hollyoaks
 Tessie Tomas (born 1945), Filipina actress, comedian, and a former advertising executive
 Tessie Wall (1869–1932), American madam and brothel owner

See also
 Tess (given name)
 Tessie (disambiguation)
 Lucille Ball (1911–1989), American actress, comedian, model, film studio executive and producer nicknamed "Technicolor Tessie"

Feminine given names
Hypocorisms
Lists of people by nickname